San Germano dei Berici is a frazione of Val Liona in the province of Vicenza, Veneto, Italy since 2017. It is east of SP500.

Sources

(Google Maps)

Cities and towns in Veneto
Val Liona